Zaina Nicola Issa Petro is a Jordanian footballer who plays as a defender. She has been a member of the Jordan women's national team.

References

Living people
Jordanian women's footballers
Women's association football defenders
Jordan women's international footballers
Footballers at the 2010 Asian Games
Year of birth missing (living people)
Asian Games competitors for Jordan